The University of Botswana, Lesotho and Swaziland (UBLS) was a predecessor to the universities of the respective countries, presently National University of Lesotho, University of Botswana and University of Eswatini. The University was formerly known as the University of Basutoland, Bechuanaland and Swaziland (UBBS), which had its headquarters in Lesotho between 1964 and 1975. The UBBS had developed from the Pius XII Catholic University College at Roma, which was the product of a long-held desire of the Roman Catholic hierarchy in Southern Africa for an institution of higher learning for Africans.

The UBLS awarded its first degrees in April 1967, after a transitional period during which former Pius XII College students continued to take University of South Africa degrees. The university became University of Botswana and Swaziland (UBS) after the National University of Lesotho was established on October 20, 1975. The ultimate end of UBS was in the 1981-1982 academic year when Universities of Swaziland and Botswana were established independently.

See also
 List of split up universities

References

National University of Lesotho
Education in Eswatini
Universities and colleges in Eswatini